Ivanovka is a rural locality (a village) in Chernushinsky District, Perm Krai, Russia. The population was 27 as of 2010. There are 2 streets.

Geography 
Ivanovka is located 30 km southeast of Chernushka (the district's administrative centre) by road. Teklovka is the nearest rural locality.

References 

Rural localities in Chernushinsky District